Largen's clawed frog or the Sidamo clawed frog (Xenopus largeni) is a species of frogs in the family Pipidae. Endemic to Ethiopia its natural habitats are subtropical or tropical moist montane forests, rivers, freshwater marshes, arable land, and rural gardens. It is classed as endangered due to the decline of its habitat in the Ethiopian Highlands.

References

Xenopus
Amphibians of Ethiopia
Endemic fauna of Ethiopia
Amphibians described in 1995
Taxonomy articles created by Polbot